Splitsville 1 is a  split album by the American rock and roll bands Supersuckers and Electric Frankenstein. It was released in 2002 via The Music Cartel. Each band covers a song by the other.

Track listing
Supersuckers:
"Then I'm Gone"
"Shit Fire"
"Devil's Food"
"Kid's got it Comin'"
"Teenage Shutdown" (Electric Frankenstein cover)
Electric Frankenstein: 	 
"Sweet Baby Arrogance"
"Rip it Apart"
"Good for Nothing"
"Not this Time"
"She's My Bitch" (Supersuckers cover)

References

Electric Frankenstein albums
Supersuckers albums
2002 EPs
Split EPs